The 2008 Liège–Bastogne–Liège monument classic cycling race took place on April 27, 2008 and was won by Spaniard Alejandro Valverde of , beating Italian Davide Rebellin of  and Luxembourger Fränk Schleck of  in a sprint finish. It was the 94th running of the Liège–Bastogne–Liège, organised by Amaury Sport Organisation and the Royal Pesant Club Liégeois.

Results

External links

 Preview of 2008 Liege Bastogne Liege

2008
2008 in road cycling
2008 in Belgian sport